Štvrtok na Ostrove (formerly ) is a village and municipality in the Dunajská Streda District in the Trnava Region of south-west Slovakia.

Geography 
The village is in the Danubian Lowland and is in the western part of Žitný ostrov (Csallóköz). The municipality lies at an altitude of 128 metres and covers an area of 13.066 km2.

History 
In the 11th century, the territory of Štvrtok na Ostrove became part of the Kingdom of Hungary. The earliest extant document about the village dates back to 1217, in which it was referred to it by its Hungarian name as Villa Ceturthuc.
 
In the thirteenth century German settlers arrived in the village who named it Loipersdorfin. The village enjoyed Royal privilege to collect tolls and in the fifteenth century it gained the status of a town and had the right to hold markets and develop crafts and trades.  Today Štvrtok na Ostrove is a basically agricultural village.

Until the end of World War I, it was part of Hungary and fell within the Somorja district of Pozsony County. After the Austro-Hungarian army disintegrated in November 1918, Czechoslovak troops occupied the area. After the Treaty of Trianon of 1920, the village became officially part of Czechoslovakia. In November 1938, the First Vienna Award granted the area to Hungary and it was held by Hungary until 1945. After Soviet occupation in 1945, Czechoslovak administration returned and the village became officially part of Czechoslovakia in 1947.

Demography 
In 1910, the village had a population of 1228, mostly Hungarians.

At the 2001 Census the recorded population of the village was 1679 while an end-2008 estimate by the Statistical Office had the village's population as 1751. As of 2001, 82.85% of its population was Hungarian while 12.33% was Slovak.

As of 2001, 93.81% of the inhabitants professed Roman Catholicism.

Landmarks 
 The village is dominated by the late Romanesque church of St James the Elder which is mentioned in documents from 1333. The church was altered over the years and the most extensive modifications took place following damage caused by the 1590 Neulengbach earthquake.
The cultural monuments in the village include the Holy Trinity column,  the St. Florian statue of 1893,  several roadside crosses and monuments to the victims of the First and Second World Wars.

References

External links
Local news at www.parameter.sk 

Villages and municipalities in Dunajská Streda District
Hungarian communities in Slovakia